Trirhabda pilosa is a species of skeletonizing leaf beetle in the family Chrysomelidae. It is found in North America.

Subspecies
These two subspecies belong to the species Trirhabda pilosa:
 Trirhabda pilosa pilosa Blake, 1931
 Trirhabda pilosa vittata Hogue in Hatch, 1971

References

Further reading

 
 

Galerucinae
Articles created by Qbugbot
Beetles described in 1931
Taxa named by Doris Holmes Blake